Smendes is the Hellenized form of the ancient Egyptian name Nesubanebdjed or Nesubanebdjedet (nỉ-sw-b3-nb-ḏd.t; 'He belongs to Banebdjed'). Known bearers of the name include:

 Smendes, pharaoh of the 21st dynasty;
 Smendes II, High Priest of Amun during the 21st dynasty;
 Smendes III, High Priest of Amun during the 22nd dynasty;
 Nesubanebdjed, a palace official, married to the sister of Nectanebo I.

See also
 Sam Mendes

Ancient Egyptian given names
Theophoric names